George Frederick Tyson ( – 21 May 1937) was an English professional rugby league footballer who played in the 1900s and 1910s.

Playing career

International honours
Tyson won caps for England while at Oldham in 1908 against Wales, in 1909 against Australia (2 matches), and Wales, and won caps for Great Britain while at Oldham in 1908 against New Zealand, and in 1908-09 against Australia (3 matches).

Championship appearances
George Tyson played in Oldham's victory in the Championship during the 1904–05 season.

George Tyson played , i.e. number 2, in Oldham's 3-7 defeat by Wigan in the Championship Final during the 1908–09 season at the Willows, Salford on Saturday 1 May 1909.

Challenge Cup Final appearances
George Tyson played , i.e. number 5, in Oldham's 3-17 defeat by Warrington in the 1907 Challenge Cup Final during the 1906–07 season at Wheater's Field, Broughton, Salford on Saturday 27 April 1907, in front of a crowd of 18,500.

County Cup Final appearances
George Tyson played , i.e. number 2, in Oldham's 9-10 defeat by Wigan in the 1908 Lancashire County Cup Final during the 1908–09 season at Wheater's Field, Broughton, Salford on Saturday 19 December 1908.

Club career
George Tyson was considered a "Probable" for the 1910 Great Britain Lions tour of Australia and New Zealand, but decided not to take part in the tour due to "business reasons".

References

External links
Statistics at orl-heritagetrust.org.uk

1880s births
1937 deaths
England national rugby league team players
English rugby league players
Great Britain national rugby league team players
Oldham R.L.F.C. players
Rugby league players from Oldham
Rugby league wingers